Allen Gardens may refer to:

 Allan Gardens, Toronto, Ontario, Canada
 Allen Centennial Gardens, University of Wisconsin–Madison